Sean Patrick Roughan (born 31 August 2003) is an Irish professional footballer who plays as a defender for Lincoln City.

Club career

Lincoln City
He signed his first professional contract on 28 July 2020 following a successful spell in the Lincoln City academy. He would make his professional debut the following game starting the EFL Cup tie on 5 September 2020 against Crewe Alexandra . He then made his league debut for the Imps the following Saturday in a 2-0 home win against Oxford United. In May 2021, he was spotted on trial at Premier League clubs Southampton and  Chelsea On 26 January 2022, he would join Drogheda United on loan for their upcoming 2022 season. An option was taken on his Lincoln City contract on 18 May 2022. He would return from his Drogheda United loan spelling following fifteen appearances.

He scored his first ever goal in the EFL Trophy against Everton U21 on 13 December 2022.

International career
He would be called up to the Republic of Ireland U21 team for the first time on 25 May 2021 to play in games against Switzerland, Denmark and Australia. On 16 November 2021, Roughan scored on his debut for the Republic of Ireland U19 team, a 2–0 win away to Bulgaria U19 in a 2022 UEFA European Under-19 Championship qualififier.

Career statistics

References 

Living people
Republic of Ireland association footballers
Lincoln City F.C. players
Drogheda United F.C. players
Association football defenders
2003 births
English Football League players
League of Ireland players